The Gold Experience is the seventeenth studio album by American singer, songwriter, producer and multi-instrumentalist Prince. It was credited to his stage name at the time, an unpronounceable symbol (shown on the album cover), also known as the "Love Symbol".

The album was produced entirely by Prince and released on September 26, 1995, by NPG Records and Warner Bros. Records. The album charted at number 6 on the Billboard 200 and number 2 on the Top R&B Albums. The singles "The Most Beautiful Girl in the World", "I Hate U", and "Gold" charted on the Billboard Hot 100 at numbers 3, 12, and 88 respectively.

On June 18, 2022, The Gold Experience was reissued for Record Store Day 2022. The reissue on vinyl is a replica of the original translucent gold expanded, limited promo album from 1995. The day prior, the album's CD version was rereleased. This marked the first time the complete album had been reissued following the legal battle over "The Most Beautiful Girl in the World".

Reception

The Gold Experience sold 500,000 copies in the United States and peaked at number six on the Billboard 200, failing to meet the record label's commercial expectations. According to biographer Jason Draper, it may have undersold because Prince was losing touch with younger listeners and also because his contractual dispute with Warner Bros. Records overshadowed the album's promotion, which he had done well before it was released.

Nonetheless, The Gold Experience was a success with critics. Melody Maker called it Prince's best record in years, while Vibe said it was his best since Sign o' the Times in 1987. In The Village Voice, Robert Christgau wrote that it showcased not only the unbridled artistry displayed on his other records but also "a renewal. It's as sex-obsessed as ever, only with more juice—'Shhh' and '319' especially pack the kind of porno jolt sexy music rarely gets near and hard music never does." He believed its best songs, specifically "Endorphinmachine" and "P Control", "funk and rock as outrageously and originally as anything he's ever recorded". Jon Pareles was less enthusiastic in The New York Times, finding most of the songs to be minor successes and calling it "a proficient album, not a startling one; most of its songs are variations and retreads of previous Prince efforts."

The Gold Experience was voted the 30th best album of 1995 in the Pazz & Jop, an annual poll of American critics published by The Village Voice. Christgau, the poll's supervisor, ranked it 10th best in his own year-end list. In a retrospective review, Keith Harris from Blender cited The Gold Experience as the best album Prince recorded in the 1990s, "a mix of newly stripped-down funk and delicate balladry that reasserts his dynamic range".

Several people speculated that the song "Billy Jack Bitch" was written about a Minneapolis Star Tribune gossip columnist known as "CJ". Prince denied the song was about the columnist when CJ herself interviewed him.

Track listing

Notes
 Every use of the pronoun "I" throughout the song titles and liner notes is represented by a stylized "👁" symbol. This symbol is commonly transliterated as "Eye" amongst Prince fans, as "👁 No" and "I Wish U Heaven" both appeared on Lovesexy.

Personnel
 Prince – lead vocals and various instruments
 Tommy Barbarella, Mr. Hayes – keyboards (3, 4, 8, 12, 15, 16, 18)
 Sonny T. – bass (3, 4, 8, 12, 15, 16, 18), backing vocals (5)
 Michael Bland aka "Michael B." – drums (3, 4, 8, 12, 15, 16, 18)
 Ricky Peterson – additional keyboards (5, 7, 12, 16, 18)
 Kirk Johnson – drum programming (5)
 James Behringer – additional guitar (7)
 Brian Gallagher – tenor saxophone (10, 12, 15)
 Kathy Jensen – baritone saxophone (10, 12, 15)
 Dave Jensen, Steve Strand – trumpet (10, 12, 15)
 Michael B. Nelson – trombone (10, 12, 15), horn arrangement (15)
 Nona Gaye – co-lead vocals (5)
 Mayte – spoken vocals (1, 5)
 Rain Ivana (as NPG Operator) – voice (2, 6, 9, 11, 13, 15-18)

Produced by Prince, except:
7, 12, 16, 18, co-produced by Ricky Peterson, and 5, co-produced with Ricky Peterson and Kirk Johnson.

Singles
 "The Most Beautiful Girl in the World" (#3 US, #2 US R&B, #1 UK, #1 Australia)
 "Eye Hate U" (#12 US, #3 US R&B, #20 UK)
 "Gold" (#88 US, #92 US R&B, #10 UK)

Another track, "Shhh", charted from The Gold Experience in July 1994; it was not the album version, but rather a live version performed on The Beautiful Experience TV special, which aired in 1994. It received some R&B airplay, causing it to chart and peak at #62 on the US Hot R&B/Hip-Hop Airplay chart.

Charts

Weekly charts

Year-end charts

Certifications

References

External links
 

1995 albums
Prince (musician) albums
Albums produced by Prince (musician)
NPG Records albums
Warner Records albums